El Encano is a settlement in Pasto Municipality, Nariño Department in Colombia.

Climate
El Encano has a subtropical highland climate (Köppen Cfb) characterised by pleasant afternoons, cool mornings and persistent fog with extremely limited sunshine year-round. Rainfall is moderate to heavy throughout the year, with the wettest months being from April to June.

References

Nariño Department